The Faery Queen may be:

 The Faerie Queene, 1590 epic poem by Edmund Spenser
 The Fairy-Queen, 1692 music drama by Henry Purcell based on Shakespeare's Midsummer Night's Dream (and not on Spenser's poem)